Hyposmocoma petalifera is a species of moth of the family Cosmopterigidae. It is endemic to the Hawaiian island of Maui.

External links

petalifera
Endemic moths of Hawaii
Moths described in 1907
Taxa named by Thomas de Grey, 6th Baron Walsingham